SSU may refer to:

Universities
 Sacramento State University, California
 Salem State University, Massachusetts
 Salisbury State University, Maryland
 Samar State University, Philippines
 Saratov State University, Russia
 Savannah State University, Georgia
 Shawnee State University, Ohio
 Sonoma State University, California
 Soongsil University, South Korea
 Southampton Solent University, England
 Southern States University, California
 Sri Sai University, India

Science and technology
 Second, Saybolt universal, a standardised measure of kinematic viscosity
 Small-subunit ribosomal RNA, as in the SSU rDNA gene or SSU rRNA product (prokaryotic 16S ribosomal RNA, mitochondrial 12S ribosomal RNA, eukaryotic 18S ribosomal RNA)
 Synchronization Supply Unit, to reduce synchronization problems in digital telecommunications

Security
Sanitary Squad Unit, a unit in the United States Army Ambulance Service during World War I
Security Service of Ukraine
Special Security Unit, a specialized unit of the Sindh Police for performing security and counterterrorism functions 
Strategic Services Unit, a US intelligence organization of the 1940s
Special Support Unit, was the police tactical unit of the Royal Ulster Constabulary active during The Troubles. Formed as a replacement to the Special Patrol Group in 1981 and a predecessor of the Headquarters Mobile Support Unit

Other uses
 Sony's Spider-Man Universe
 Sudan Socialist Union
 Swedish Social Democratic Youth League

Educational institution disambiguation pages